Goodrich is an unincorporated community in Morgan County, Colorado United States near Orchard, Colorado and Fort Morgan, Colorado.  Jackson Lake State Park is located northeast of Goodrich.

A post office called Goodrich was established in 1908, and remained in operation until 1974. The community was named after G. T. Goodrich, an early settler.

See also 

Outline of Colorado
Index of Colorado-related articles
State of Colorado
Colorado cities and towns
Colorado census designated places
Colorado counties
Morgan County, Colorado
Colorado metropolitan areas
Fort Morgan, CO Micropolitan Statistical Area

References 

Unincorporated communities in Morgan County, Colorado
Unincorporated communities in Colorado